Camp Lake is a small tarn located in the Emigrant Wilderness in Tuolumne County, California, approximately  north of Yosemite National Park. It is accessible only to hikers and equestrians via the popular Deer Lake Trail.

Once a good fishing lake for Brook Trout, Camp Lake is no longer stocked by the California Department of Fish and Game due to the ongoing restoration of the Mountain Yellow Legged Frog in the Sierra Nevada. The lake once suffered from both winter and summer kills and relied on annual plants to sustain the fish population. The lake no longer contains trout.

Trail information
The Crabtree Camp Trailhead is large and usually full. The trail to Deer Lake descends a little, then begins climbing. Backpackers continue to other lakes beyond.

See also
 List of lakes in California

References

External links
Wilderness Press. Sierra North: Backcountry Trips in California's Sierra Nevada. 9 ed. Berkeley: Wilderness Press, 2005.
Gong, Kevin. Kevin's Hiking Page. 28 Mar. 2001. 21 Oct 2006.
Lowe, Jim. High Country Flyfisher.com 2002-06-09.

Lakes of Tuolumne County, California
Lakes of Northern California
Lakes of California